The trapezoid ligament is a ligament connecting the coracoid process of the scapula (the shoulder blade) to the trapezoid line of the clavicle (collarbone).  It is an anterior and lateral fasciculus, and is broad, thin, and quadrilateral. Its anterior border is free; its posterior border is joined with the conoid ligament, the two forming, by their junction, an angle projecting backward.

References

External links
 

Ligaments of the upper limb